Isaac Alejandro Díaz Lobos (born 24 March 1990) is a Chilean professional footballer who plays as a striker for Primera B side Deportes Copiapó.

Career
In December 2019, Díaz returned to Mexico and joined Ascenso MX club Cafetaleros, the club he also played for in 2016.

On 2021 season, he returned to Chile and joined Primera B side Deportes Iquique.

Honours
Universidad de Chile
 Copa Chile: 2012–13

Puebla
 Supercopa MX: 2015

References

External links
 
 

1990 births
Living people
People from Llanquihue Province
People from Los Lagos Region
Chilean footballers
Chilean expatriate footballers
C.D. Huachipato footballers
Trasandino footballers
Naval de Talcahuano footballers
Ñublense footballers
Universidad de Chile footballers
Chiapas F.C. footballers
Club Puebla players
Cafetaleros de Chiapas footballers
Club Sol de América footballers
Everton de Viña del Mar footballers
Cancún F.C. footballers
Deportes Iquique footballers
Deportes Copiapó footballers
Chilean Primera División players
Primera B de Chile players
Liga MX players
Ascenso MX players
Paraguayan Primera División players
Liga de Expansión MX players
Association football forwards
Expatriate footballers in Mexico
Expatriate footballers in Paraguay
Chilean expatriate sportspeople in Mexico
Chilean expatriate sportspeople in Paraguay